The second season of Laverne & Shirley, an American television sitcom series, began airing on September 28, 1976 on ABC. The season concluded on April 5, 1977 after 23 episodes.

The season aired Tuesdays at 8:30-9:00 pm (EST). It ranked 2nd among television programs and garnered a 30.9 rating. The entire season was released on DVD in North America on April 17, 2007.

Overview
The series revolves around the titular characters Laverne DeFazio and Shirley Feeney, bottle-cappers at Shotz Brewery in 1950s Milwaukee, Wisconsin. Episode plots include their adventures with neighbors and friends, Lenny and Squiggy.

Cast

Starring
Penny Marshall as Laverne DeFazio
Cindy Williams as Shirley Feeney
Michael McKean as Leonard "Lenny" Kosnowski
David Lander as Andrew "Squiggy" Squiggman
Phil Foster as Frank DeFazio
Eddie Mekka as Carmine Ragusa
Betty Garrett as Edna Babish

Guest-starring
Ron Howard as Richie Cunningham
Anson Williams as Potsie Weber
Scott Brady as Jack Feeney, Shirley's father
Maureen Arthur as Veronica
Severn Darden as Charles Pfister Krane

Episodes

References

Laverne & Shirley seasons
1976 American television seasons
1977 American television seasons